Elia Fottrell (1893–1974) was an American tennis player. He was from California. He was ambidextrous and could play with the racket in either hand. Fottrell reached the semifinals in the 1914 U.S. Championships singles, beating Nat Niles and Gus Touchard before losing easily to R. Norris Williams.

References

1893 births
1974 deaths
American male tennis players
Tennis people from California